Spilostethus crudelis is a species of seed bug in the family Lygaeidae, found in southern Africa.

References

External links

 

Lygaeidae
Insects described in 1781